Megachile bombiformis is a species of bee in the family Megachilidae. It was described by Carl Eduard Adolph Gerstaecker in 1857.

References

Bombiformis
Insects described in 1857